Shamila N. Chaudhary is an America foreign policy expert and academic who is the Senior South Asia Fellow at New America and Senior Advisor to Dean Vali Nasr at the Johns Hopkins University School of Advanced International Studies. She specializes in U.S. counterterrorism and national security issues, U.S.-Pakistan relations, Pakistan internal politics, and regional issues in South Asia.

Public service career 
Chaudhary worked on democracy and governance issues at the U.S. Agency for International Development from 2000-2004. She then served on the State Department’s Pakistan Desk from 2007-2009 and covered economic, humanitarian response, and development issues on the Indonesia desk from 2004-2007. Chaudhary rose through the ranks at the State Department after impressing Secretary Hillary Clinton with her knowledge and outspoken nature during a briefing.

Chaudhary then served as a member of the Secretary of State's Policy Planning Staff and as a senior adviser to Special Representative to Afghanistan and Pakistan Richard Holbrooke, beginning in February 2009. 

From April 2010 until July 2011, she worked as Pakistan Director at the National Security Council. After leaving government service, Chaudhary worked on Pakistan, Afghanistan, and Sri Lanka at the political risk consulting firm Eurasia Group  from 2011-2013.

Writing 
Chaudhary's writings cover United States foreign policy, counterterrorism, and national security issues in South Asia in addition to other diverse topics such as energy policy and feminism & national identity. She is a frequent contributor to Foreign Policy  and her work has also been featured in The Washington Post, Current History, The Daily Beast, and the BBC.

Chaudhary earned an M.A. in International Affairs from the American University School of International Service and a B.A. in English Literature and Women’s Studies from the University of Toledo. She was a 1999 David L. Boren National Security Education Program (NSEP) Fellow and studied Urdu in Lahore, Pakistan as part of her fellowship. 

Chaudhary and her husband established the Chaudhary-Steinitz Research grant at University of Toledo to support undergraduate students studying issues related to Pakistan.

References

External links
 Rob Asghar, "Pakistani-Americans: A Chance for "These People" to Make a Difference"

United States Department of State officials
American people of Pakistani descent
American University School of International Service alumni
University of Toledo alumni
Living people
Year of birth missing (living people)
American scholars of Pakistan studies
Obama administration personnel